Alexei Olegovich Sintsov (born 19 March 1995) is a Russian pair skater. With partner Anastasia A. Gubanova, he won gold at the 2015 ISU Junior Grand Prix in the United States and competed at two World Junior Championships, placing fourth in 2015.

Career 
Sintsov began skating in 2000.

Partnership with Gubanova 
Sintsov teamed up with Anastasia A. Gubanova in 2011. The pair placed fourth at the 2015 World Junior Championships in Tallinn, Estonia.

Gubanova/Sintsov started the 2015–16 JGP season by taking gold in Colorado Springs, Colorado, finishing 3.54 points ahead of silver medalists Joy Weinberg / Maximiliano Fernandez. They won bronze in Toruń, Poland, sharing the podium with Ekaterina Borisova / Dmitry Sopot (gold) and Amina Atakhanova / Ilia Spiridonov (silver). These results qualified them for the 2015–16 JGP Final in Barcelona, where they finished fourth. Gubanova/Sintsov finished 8th at the Russian Championships and fourth at the junior level. Named as alternates for the 2016 World Junior Championships, they were called up when an injury led Atakhanova/Spiridonov to withdraw. They placed 11th in both segments and 11th overall at the event in Debrecen, Hungary.

Programs 
(with Gubanova)

Competitive highlights 
JGP: Junior Grand Prix

With Gubanova

References

External links 

 

1995 births
Russian male pair skaters
Living people
Sportspeople from Kirov, Kirov Oblast